St. Sava's Church in Paris is a Serbian Orthodox church in France. The church had been used as Protestant church in the past. From 1962 it was rented for worship, and in 1984 it was purchased and converted to the Serbian Orthodox Church. The church is located at the address 23 rue du Simplon, in the 18th arrondissement.

See also
Serbian Orthodox Eparchy of Western Europe

References

Eastern Orthodox church buildings in Paris
Serbian Orthodox church buildings in France
Buildings and structures in the 18th arrondissement of Paris
Saint Sava